The Critics' Choice Television Award for Best Actor in a Comedy Series is one of the award categories presented annually by the Critics' Choice Television Awards (BTJA) (US) to recognize the work done by television actors. It was introduced in 2011 when the event was first initiated. The winners are selected by a group of television critics that are part of the Broadcast Television Critics Association.

Winners and nominees

2010s

2020s

Programs with Multiple wins
2 wins
 Barry
 The Big Bang Theory
 Louie
 Transparent
 Ted Lasso

Programs with Multiple nominations
6 nominations
 The Big Bang Theory

4 nominations
 black-ish
 Louie

3 nominations
 Barry
 Brockmire
 The Good Place
 The Last Man on Earth
 Only Murders in the Building
 Silicon Valley
 Transparent
 What We Do in the Shadows

2 nominations
 Atlanta
 Community
 Fresh Off the Boat
 The Great
 House of Lies
 Master of None
 The Mindy Project
 Parks and Recreation
 Ramy
 Schitt's Creek
 Ted Lasso

Performers with Multiple wins
2 wins
 Bill Hader (consecutive)
 Louis C.K. (consecutive)
 Jim Parsons
 Jason Sudeikis (consecutive)
 Jeffrey Tambor (consecutive)

Performers with Multiple nominations
5 nominations
 Jim Parsons

4 nominations
 Anthony Anderson
 Louis C.K.
 Bill Hader

3 nominations
 Hank Azaria
 Ted Danson
 Will Forte
 Thomas Middleditch
 Jeffrey Tambor

2 nominations
 Aziz Ansari
 Matt Berry
 Don Cheadle
 Donald Glover
 Nicholas Hoult
 Eugene Levy
 Steve Martin
 Joel McHale
 Chris Messina
 Randall Park
 Adam Scott
 Jason Sudeikis
 Ramy Youssef

See also
 TCA Award for Individual Achievement in Comedy
 Primetime Emmy Award for Outstanding Lead Actor in a Comedy Series
 Golden Globe Award for Best Actor – Television Series Musical or Comedy
 Screen Actors Guild Award for Outstanding Performance by a Male Actor in a Comedy Series

References

External links
 

Critics' Choice Television Awards
Television awards for Best Actor